Pavel Albertovich Lobkov (born September 21, 1967, Sestroretsk) is a Russian journalist, who was one of the main anchorpersons and commentators of the television channel Dozhd (2012-2021). Previously, he was the host of the program Progress with Pavel Lobkov on the Petersburg – Channel 5 (2007–2008), the NTV television broadcaster (1993–2006, 2008–2011) and the program correspondent Itogi (1993–2001).

Biography
He was born in the city of Sestroretsk (Sestroretsk District of Leningrad; now in the Kurortny District of St. Petersburg). In 1988 he graduated from the biological faculty of the Leningrad State University with a degree in botany. He studied at the graduate school of the Botanical Institute of Komarov Academy of Sciences of the USSR. Internship in Holland, but he did not defend the thesis.

Since 1990 he worked as a correspondent for the information service of the TRK Petersburg, including the Fifth Wheel program. Since October 1993 – Director of the representation of NTV in St. Petersburg. From 1995 to 2004 he was a correspondent for the NTV information service. He did subjects for the information programs  Segodnya, Itogi, Namedni, and  Country and World.

From 1995 to 1997, together with Yevgeny Kiselyov and Leonid Parfyonov, he led the program  Hero of the Day. Laureate of TEFI-1998 as the best reporter.

Since August 2006 the author of a number of documentary projects at Petersburg – Channel 5. He was also the chief editor of the Directorate of Documentary Broadcasting of the Channel 5 and directed the information and analytical program  Week in a Large Country.

In 2008 he returned to NTV, where he was fired on January 16, 2012, before the end of the contract.

Since February 2012 he works on the Dozhd Channel. In February 2013 he recorded a video message for the project Be Stronger, directed against homophobia. He was the host of the program  We Ride at Home  on  Rain, paired with Sasha Filipenko. Now he is one of the leading final news and the weekly program  The Burden of News.

Personal life
He was never married and has no children. December 1, 2015 on the air of the television channel Dozhd Pavel announced that he is HIV-positive since 2003. He is a member of the Board of Trustees of the AIDS.Center Foundation.

In 2019, he came out as gay.

Filmography

Documentary 
1999  —  The Mausoleum
2001  —  USSR: The Last Days
2008  — Tulip, Rose, Orchid
2009  —  Genes Against Us
2009  —  The Dictatorship of the Brain
2009  —  Infected: Enemy Within Us
2010  —  Tablet from Old Age
2010  —  The Formula of Love
2010  —  Life for Food
2010  —  The Power of Sleep
2010  —  Life Without Pain
2011  —  The Gene of Power
2011  —  The Strange Sex
2011  —  The Great Deception of the Vision
2011  —  The Empire of Feelings

Feature films 
  2011  —  Amazon as cameo

References

External links
 
 Павел Лобков на Пятом канале

1967 births
Living people
People from Sestroretsk
Russian journalists
Russian television personalities
Saint Petersburg State University alumni
TV Rain
Russian LGBT rights activists
Russian LGBT journalists
People with HIV/AIDS
20th-century Russian journalists
21st-century Russian journalists
Russian activists against the 2022 Russian invasion of Ukraine